Tiberius Sempronius Longus (c. 260 BC – unknown) was a Roman consul during the Second Punic War and a contemporary of Publius Cornelius Scipio (father of Scipio Africanus). In 218 BC, Sempronius was sent to Sicily with 160 quinqueremes to gather forces and supplies, while Scipio was sent to Iberia to intercept Hannibal. It was at this time, striking from Lilybaeum, on the island of Sicily, that Sempronius Longus captured Malta from the Carthaginians.

Shortly thereafter, with Scipio wounded and pursued by Hannibal's forces after the Battle of Ticinus, the Senate sent for Tiberius Sempronius Longus. Upon his arrival in December, and reportedly against Scipio's advice, Sempronius Longus led an ambitious attack at the Battle of the Trebia. His army charged into a trap and was enveloped by the forces of Hannibal's brother, Mago. Although it was a crushing Roman defeat, Tiberius Sempronius Longus and a force of 10,000 infantrymen fought their way through the rear Carthaginian lines and to safety.

In January 217 BC Sempronius Longus returned to Rome to oversee the elections for the new consuls.  He was succeeded by Gaius Flaminius and returned to his army at their winter encampment.

In 215 BC, Sempronius fought Hanno at Grumentum. His army killed 2,000 enemy men and captured 280 more, pushing Hanno out of Lucania back to Bruttium and allowing the towns of Vercellium, Vescellium, and Sicilinum to be recaptured for Rome.

He is the father of Tiberius Sempronius Longus, the consul of 194 BC.

References

External links
Public domain database of Roman history

260 BC births
210 BC deaths
3rd-century BC Roman consuls
Ancient Roman generals
Longus, Tiberius
Roman commanders of the Second Punic War
Year of birth uncertain